The 2007 European Women Basketball Championship, commonly called EuroBasket Women 2007, was the 31st regional championship held by FIBA Europe. The competition was held in Italy and took place from September 24, 2007 to October 7, 2007. Russia won the gold medal and Spain the silver medal while Belarus won the bronze. Amaya Valdemoro from Spain was named the tournament MVP.

Qualification

Squads

Preliminary round 

Times given below are in Central European Summer Time (UTC+2).

Group A

Group B

Group C

Group D

Qualifying round

Group E

Group F 

{{Basketballbox|bg=#eee |date=September 29|place= Ortona |time=15:30
|teamA= |scoreA=64
|teamB= |scoreB=79
|Q1=18–25|Q2=14–22|Q3=15–16|Q4=17–16
| attendance =1000
| referee =Marcin Kowalski , Emin Mogulkoc, Robert Lottermoser
}}

Knockout stage
Championship bracket

5th place bracket

 Quarterfinals 

Classification rounds

 Semifinals 

 Third place game

 Final 

All EuroBasket Women 2007''' team:
Amaya Valdemoro
Anete Jēkabsone-Žogota()
Natallia Marchanka
Maria Stepanova
Olga Arteshina

Final standings

Olympic qualification

The team qualified directly to Beijing 2008:
 

The following four teams have assured a place in the Olympic qualifying tournament:

References

External links 
EuroBasket Women 2007 official site

 
2007
EuroBasket Women
Eurobasket Women
International women's basketball competitions hosted by Italy
September 2007 sports events in Europe
October 2007 sports events in Europe
2007–08 in Italian basketball